The 2018 Louisiana Tech Bulldogs football team represented Louisiana Tech University in the 2018 NCAA Division I FBS football season. The Bulldogs played their home games at the Joe Aillet Stadium in Ruston, Louisiana and competed in the West Division of Conference USA (C-USA). They were led by sixth-year head coach Skip Holtz. They finished the season 8–5, 5–3 in C-USA play to finish in a three-way tie for second place in the West Division. They were invited to the Hawaii Bowl where they defeated Hawaii.

Previous season
The Bulldogs finished the 2017 season 7–6, 4–4 in C-USA play to finish in fourth place in the West Division. They were invited to the Frisco Bowl where they defeated SMU.

Preseason

Award watch lists
Listed in the order that they were released

Preseason All-Conference USA team
Conference USA released their preseason all-Conference USA team on July 16, 2018, with the Bulldogs having four players selected.

Offense

O'Shea Dugas – OL

Teddy Veal – WR

Defense

Jaylon Ferguson – DL

Amik Robertson – DB

Preseason media poll
Conference USA released their preseason media poll on July 17, 2018, with the Bulldogs predicted to finish in second place in the West Division.

Roster

Schedule

Schedule Source:

Radio
Radio coverage for all games will be broadcast statewide on the Louisiana Tech Sports Network by Learfield Sports. The radio announcers are Dave Nitz with play-by-play, Teddy Allen with color commentary, and Nick Brown with sideline reports.

Game summaries

at South Alabama

Southern

at LSU

at North Texas

UAB

at UTSA

UTEP

at Florida Atlantic

at Mississippi State

Rice

at Southern Miss

Western Kentucky

vs. Hawaii (Hawaii Bowl)

Players drafted into the NFL

References

Louisiana Tech
Louisiana Tech Bulldogs football seasons
Hawaii Bowl champion seasons
Louisiana Tech Bulldogs football